Antoni Tomiczek (13 November 1915 – 19 November 2013) was a Polish pilot of World War II.

Biography
Tomiczek was born in Pstrążna in Silesia. His parents were Francis Tomiczek (an employee of the Coal Mine in Rydułtowy) and Marianna (née Szymiczek).

From 1922–1930, he attended school in Pstrążna. After graduating, he joined the School of Infantry NCOs to minors in Konin. He took part in addressing Zaolzie in October 1938. Immediately after, he was directed to the course instructors to Warsaw (theoretical) and Radom (practical training).

On 20 November 1946 Antoni Tomiczek ended his service in the Polish Air Force to become an ensign warrant officer. He decided to return to the country and on 12 May 1947, for the first time in many years, he stood on Polish soil in Gdańsk. He returned to Upper Silesia, his homeland. He later belonged to the Association of South Polish Airmen in Jaworzno and Senior Aviation Club in Katowice. For his actions in combat during World War II, he was awarded the Cross of Valour, twice; and the Medal of the Yugoslav Medalja "Smrt fasizmu – Sloboda of the Nation," the Knight's Cross of Merit (Officer's Cross of the Polish Revival) and the Order of Merit for the Katowice Province.

Sources (Polish language)
1. GimnazjumLyski.pl
2. Katowice.Gazeta.pl
3. Lokalna24.pl
4. Polishairforce.pl

1915 births
2013 deaths
Polish aviators